The Chief Economic Adviser to the Government of India (CEA) advises the government on economic matters and is responsible for the preparation of the Economic survey of India tabled in Parliament before the Union budget of India is presented. The CEA holds the rank of a Secretary to the Government of India. 

The CEA is the ex-officio cadre-controlling authority of the Indian Economic Service. The CEA is head of Economic Division of the Department of Economic Affairs, Ministry of Finance, Government of India. Until 2009, the CEA’s position was a Union Public Service Commission appointment and until the 1970s almost all CEAs were members of the Indian Economic Service.

One CEA, Manmohan Singh went on to become the Prime Minister of India. Four CEAs have gone on to become the Governor of the Reserve Bank of India - I. G. Patel, Manmohan Singh, Bimal Jalan and Raghuram Rajan, and one (Rakesh Mohan) became the Deputy Governor of the RBI.

Role of the CEA 
The extent to which the Government takes into account the advice of the Chief Economic Adviser has generally been considered to be open-ended. 

In his 2018 book titled Of Counsel: The Challenges of the Modi-Jaitley Economy, former CEA Arvind Subramanian stated that the job of the CEA carried no executive responsibility. According to him, the only clearly defined job of the CEA was to produce the Economic Survey of India preceding the Union Budget.

List of CEAs
Below is a list of Chief Economic Advisers that have been appointed by the Government of India since Independence in 1947.

See also 
 List of office-holders in India
 Principal Scientific Adviser to the Government of India

References

External links
Official website

Ministry of Commerce and Industry (India)
Indian government officials
Indian economists
Lists of Indian scientists